Pseudohemihyalea labeculoides is a moth in the family Erebidae. It was described by Hervé de Toulgoët in 1995. It is found in Honduras.

References

Moths described in 1995
labeculoides